Hermann Blumenthal (31 December 1905, Essen, Rhine Province – 17 August 1942, near Kljasticy, Russia) was a German sculptor. He was a participating artist in the documenta 1.

Awards 
 1929: Preis der Stadt Köln anlässlich einer Ausstellung des Deutschen Künstlerbundes
 1930: Großer Staatspreis of the Prussian Academy of Arts, verbunden mit einem Studienaufenthalt in der Villa Massimo, Rom
 1935: Stipendium des Reichserziehungsministeriums, Studienaufenthalt in Kassel
 1936: Rom-Stipendium des Reichserziehungsministeriums, Studienaufenthalt in der Villa Massimo
 1937: Villa-Romana-Stipendium, Studienaufenthalt in Florenz
 1939: Cornelius-Preis for Monumentalplastik der Stadt Düsseldorf
 1955: Posthum Teilnehmer der documenta 1, Kassel

Works 
 1929/39: Schreitender auf rechteckiger Platte, Bronze, H: 152 cm. Niedersächsischer Landtag, Hannover
 1930: Kniender (Spinne), Bronze, H: 103 cm. Staatliche Museen zu Berlin, Nationalgalerie
 1931/32: Kriechender (Adam), Bronze, H: 81 cm. Georg-Kolbe-Museum Berlin (Dauerleihgabe Nachlass Blumenthal)
 1934: Acht Reliefentwürfe for the Museum Folkwang, Essen, Bronze/Gips, 58 x 40 cm. Georg-Kolbe-Museum Berlin (Dauerleihgabe Nachlass Blumenthal)
 1935: Porträt Ludwig Kasper, Steinguss, H: 33 cm. Georg-Kolbe-Museum Berlin (Dauerleihgabe Nachlass Blumenthal)
 1935/36: Großer Schreitender, Bronze, H: 180 cm. Hamburger Kunsthalle
 1936: Sitzender aufschauend (Sterngucker), Bronze, H: 28 cm. Bayerische Staatsgemäldesammlungen München
 1936/37: Großer Stehender (Römischer Mann), Steinguss, H: 202 cm. Georg-Kolbe-Museum Berlin (Dauerleihgabe Nachlass Blumenthal)
 1937: Großer Kniender (Florentiner Mann), Bronze, H: 150 cm. Norddeutscher Rundfunk, Hamburg
 1938: Zwei Reliefs für Brunnenstele: Jüngling mit Ölzweig; Zwei Frauen, Stein, 225 x 125. Ruhland (Lausitz), BASF Schwarzheide

References 
 Der Bildhauer Hermann Blumenthal. Mit einem Vorwort von Christian Adolf Isermeyer, Berlin 1947
 Werner Haftmann: Der Bildhauer Hermann Blumenthal, in: Zeitschrift für Kunst 1949, H. 4, S. 274-277.
 Hermann Blumenthal 1905 - 1942, Ausst.Kat. Gerhard Marcks-Stiftung, Bremen 1981
 Hermann Blumenthal, Ausst.Kat. Galerie Pels-Leusden Berlin, Graphisches Kabinett Kunsthandel Wolfgang Werner Bremen, Galerie Vömel Düsseldorf, Berlin 1992
 Christian Adolf Isermeyer: Hermann Blumenthal. Das plastische Werk, Stuttgart 1993
 Ateliergemeinschaft Klosterstraße 1933–1945. Künstler in der Zeit des Nationalsozialismus, Ausst.Kat. Akademie der Künste, Berlin 1994
 Penelope Curtis (ed.): Taking Positions. Figurative Sculpture and the Third Reich. Ausst.Kat. Henry Moore Institute Leeds, Georg-Kolbe-Museum Berlin, Gerhard-Marcks-Haus Bremen, Leeds 2001
 Josephine Gabler (Hg.): Sterngucker. Hermann Blumenthal und seine Zeit, Ausst.Kat. Georg-Kolbe-Museum, Berlin 2006
 Hermann Blumenthal 1905-1942. Zeichnung Skulptur, Kunsthandel Wolfgang Werner, Bremen 2006

External links 
 http://www.meaus.com/blumenthal-hermann.htm
 https://artfacts.net/artist/hermann-blumenthal/22739

1905 births
1942 deaths
Artists from Essen
People from the Rhine Province
German Army personnel killed in World War II
20th-century German sculptors
20th-century German male artists
German male sculptors